Prince Albert Municipality is a municipality located in the Western Cape Province of South Africa.

History
At the end of the apartheid era, the area that is today the Prince Albert Local Municipality formed part of the Central Karoo Regional Services Council (RSC). The town of Prince Albert was governed by a municipal council elected by the white residents, while the coloured residents were governed by a management committee subordinate to the white council. Bitterwater (Leeu-Gamka) was also governed by a management committee subordinate to the RSC.

After the national elections of 1994 a process of local government transformation began, in which negotiations were held between the existing local authorities, political parties, and local community organisations. As a result of these negotiations, in January 1995 the municipality and management committee of Prince Albert were both dissolved and the Prince Albert Transitional Local Council (TLC) was created to replace them. In the same month the Bitterwater management committee was also replaced by the Leeu-Gamka TLC.

The TLCs were initially made up of members nominated by the various parties to the negotiations, until May 1996 when elections were held. At the time of these elections the Central Karoo District Council was established in place of the Central Karoo RSC, and transitional representative councils (TRCs) were elected to represent rural areas outside the TLCs on the District Council. The area that was to become Prince Albert Local Municipality was covered by the Prince Albert TRC.

At the local elections of December 2000 the TLCs and TRC were all dissolved and the Prince Albert Local Municipality was established as a single local authority. At the same election the Central Karoo District Council was dissolved and replaced by the Central Karoo District Municipality.

Politics 

The municipal council consists of seven members elected by mixed-member proportional representation. Four councillors are elected by first-past-the-post voting in four wards, while the remaining three are chosen from party lists so that the total number of party representatives is proportional to the number of votes received. In the election of 1 November 2021 no party obtained a majority of seats.

The following table shows the results of the 2021 election.

By-elections
The following by-elections were held to fill vacant ward seats in the period from the election in November 2021.

The by-election took place after the Karoo Gemeenskap Party (KGP), in a coalition with the African National Congress (ANC) and Patriotic Alliance (PA), expelled its ward councillor and mayor Margy Jaftha for supporting the Democratic Alliance (DA) in a motion to replace the speaker and the deputy mayor with DA representatives. Jaftha subsequently stood for the DA against KGP leader Goliat Lottering, winning the seat, and earning the DA an outright majority on the council.

References

External links
 

Local municipalities of the Central Karoo District Municipality
Karoo